WCJZ (105.7 FM, "Classic Rock CJ 105.7") is an American radio station licensed to serve the community of Cannelton, Indiana. The station is owned and operated by Hancock Communications, Inc., doing business as the Cromwell Radio Group, and the station's broadcast license is held by Hancock Communications, Inc.

WCJZ broadcasts a classic rock music format to the greater Owensboro, Kentucky, area.

Previous logo
 (Station logo under WTCJ-FM's previous classic hits format)

References

External links

CJZ
Classic rock radio stations in the United States